Cyril Beavon (27 September 1937 – 22 December 2017) was an English footballer who played in the Football League for Oxford United.

Career
Beavon joined Oxford United from Wolverhampton Wanderers in 1959, after failing to make an appearance for their first team. He spent a decade at the Manor Ground, helping the club to the Southern League championship in 1961–62, following which the club was elected to the Football League. Beavon played in every single game in that season.

Beavon left Oxford United for non-league Banbury United in 1969. Beavon was at Banbury United for three seasons before injury forced him to retire. Beavon did a number of jobs after football including a period as both a milkman and a postman.

Personal life
Beavon was the father of former player Stuart Beavon Snr, and grandfather of Stuart Beavon Jnr. He died on 22 December 2017, aged 80.

References

External links

Rage Online Profile
Image

1937 births
2017 deaths
Footballers from Barnsley
English footballers
Association football defenders
Wolverhampton Wanderers F.C. players
Oxford United F.C. players
Banbury United F.C. players
English Football League players